Events in the year 1890 in India.

Incumbents
 Empress of India – Queen Victoria
 Viceroy of India – Henry Petty-Fitzmaurice, 5th Marquess of Lansdowne

Events
 National income - 5,190 million

Law
Charitable Endowments Act
Revenue Recovery Act
Guardians and Wards Act
Prevention Of Cruelty To Animals Act
Indian Railways Act

Births
A. R. Krishnashastry, writer, researcher and translator (died 1968).

Deaths

References

 
India
Years of the 19th century in India